is a 2005 Japanese horror film directed and co-written by Kōji Shiraishi. It stars Jin Muraki as Masafumi Kobayashi, a paranormal researcher investigating a series of mysterious events for a documentary. The film employs a pseudo-documentary style of storytelling and utilizes found footage conventions, with the majority of the narrative being presented as if it were Kobayashi's documentary, made up of footage recorded by Kobayashi's cameraman. The film's cast also includes actress Marika Matsumoto, who plays a fictionalized version of herself, as well as Rio Kanno, Tomono Kuga, and Satoru Jitsunashi.

Noroi: The Curse was released in Japan in 2005, and has received limited distribution elsewhere. It has garnered generally positive reviews, with critics commending the presentation, performances from the cast, atmosphere and pacing of its narrative. It is available for streaming on Shudder.

Plot
Masafumi Kobayashi is a paranormal researcher who has produced a series of books and documentaries on supernatural activity around Japan. During the process of making a documentary titled The Curse, Kobayashi disappeared after his house burnt down and his wife Keiko was found dead in the ruins. The aforementioned documentary begins to play, shown mostly through the recordings of Kobayashi's cameraman Miyajima.

A year and a half earlier, Kobayashi investigates a woman named Junko Ishii and her son after her neighbor hears the sound of crying babies coming from her house. Ishii soon moves away, and Kobayashi and Miyajima return to her former residence to find dead pigeons on the property. Ishii's neighbor and her daughter die in a mysterious car crash. Around the same time, Kana Yano, a girl who exhibits strong psychic abilities on a variety television program, disappears. Speaking to her parents, Kobayashi learns a man named Mitsuo Hori visited Kana. Hori, an eccentric psychic, claims that Kana was taken by "ectoplasmic worms." Hori's obscure directions lead Kobayashi and Miyajima to observe a man named Osawa, who takes pigeons into his home in a nearby apartment block. Osawa is later reported missing.

After filming at a shrine, actress Marika Matsumoto finds herself fashioning yarn and wires into interconnected loops in her sleep. Kobayashi sets up a camera to record her one night and captures a voice saying the word "Kagutaba." Kobayashi visits local historian, Tanimura, who tells him that Kagutaba is the name of a demon. The residents of a village called Shimokage once summoned Kagutaba, but imprisoned it for disobeying their commands. An annual ritual was performed to appease Kagutaba until the village was demolished in 1978 to make way for a dam. The final ritual, which was filmed, was performed by a priest and his daughter. At the end of the ritual, the daughter became hysterical; Tanimura says that she was believed to have become possessed by Kagutaba. Kobayashi discovers that the daughter is Junko Ishii. He learns that Ishii worked at a nursing school where she helped perform illegal abortions and stole the fetuses.

Marika reveals that her neighbor Midori committed suicide by hanging. Midori, along with six other people including Osawa, hanged themselves in a park using nooses similar in fashion to Marika's loops. After Marika experiences strange behaviors, she goes with Kobayashi, Miyajima, and Hori to the Shimokage dam to perform the ritual to appease Kagutaba, hoping that doing so will free her from the demon's influence. After Kobayashi and Marika perform the ritual, Hori becomes agitated and runs into a nearby forest, and Kobayashi follows him. Marika flees from Miyajima, but exhibits signs of possession. She flees into the forest, pursued by Miyajima. Meanwhile, Kobayashi and Hori find the villagers' dogs slaughtered near a secluded shrine in the woods. Kobayashi's camera captures an apparition of Kana under a torii, surrounded by writhing fetuses. Marika abruptly recovers.

After delivering Marika and Hori to a hospital, Kobayashi and Miyajima break into Ishii's current home. Inside, they find that she has hanged herself, Kana is dead, and Ishii's young son is alive; a newspaper article then reveals that the boy is not Ishii's son. Kobayashi adopts the boy. Kobayashi returns to Tanimura, who shows him a scroll depicting how Kagutaba was first summoned, wherein baby monkeys were fed to a medium. Ishii tried replicating this by feeding the stolen fetuses to Kana. Marika recovers, and Hori is placed in a mental institution. He escapes and is found dead a day later.

After Kobayashi's disappearance, his video camera is discovered in a package. The tape inside shows the events that led to the destruction of Kobayashi's house: a crazed Hori arrives at the house, revealing the boy to be Kagutaba, incapacitates Kobayashi, and bludgeons the child with a rock. The bloodied boy briefly takes on the appearance of Kagutaba, and a ghostly Kana appears in a corner. Hori leaves with the boy, and Keiko becomes possessed, pouring gasoline on herself and setting herself alight. As the house burns and Kobayashi struggles to get to his feet, the movie ends. A text note says Kobayashi is still missing.

Cast

Release
The film was released in Japan in 2005. Since its release, distribution of the film outside of Japan has been limited. On June 1, 2017, it was made available for streaming in Canada on the video on demand service Shudder. In March 2020, the film was added to Shudder's catalog in the United States. The film has not received a DVD or Blu-ray release in the U.S.

Reception
Koichi Irikura of Cinema Today included Noroi: The Curse in his list of the best "documentary-style" horror films, calling the screenplay "excellent". Niina Doherty of HorrorNews.net called Noroi: The Curse "the best found footage film of the decade", referring to it as "well crafted, credible and most important of all, genuinely scary." Rob Hunter of Film School Rejects praised the film for "delivering an engrossing and increasingly terrifying experience packaged in the form of a supremely competent production." Joshua Meyer of /Film wrote that the film, with its "intricate mythology", is "like seeing a whole season of The X-Files condensed down into two unsettling hours."

Writer Megan Negrych noted that the film "weaves together a complex story of curses, demons, and the forgotten with strong attention paid to atmospheric tension and the slow-building narrative in order to pursue a more subtle and highly effective horror experience." Meagan Navarro of Bloody Disgusting emphasized the film's "methodical storytelling", writing: "For many, it works. For others, it'll drag without a satisfying payoff to merit the pacing. Wherever you fall on the spectrum of enjoyment, Noroi's place in horror remains fascinating."

See also
 Japanese horror

References

Further reading

External links
  (archived)
 
 

2005 horror films
2005 films
Japanese horror films
Found footage films
2000s mockumentary films
Films directed by Kōji Shiraishi
Fiction about curses
Films about spirit possession
Demons in film
Japanese psychological horror films
Japanese supernatural horror films
2000s Japanese films